The al-Nusra Front–SRF/Hazzm Movement conflict started in late October 2014, during the Syrian Civil War, in Idlib and Aleppo governorates, during which al-Nusra attempted to establish an Islamic state rival to that of ISIL. Despite this, the al-Nusra Front and Free Syrian Army factions continued to cooperate in the southern Syrian governorates of Quneitra and Daraa.

Background
Before the clashes, there were already tensions between Jabhat al-Nusra and the Syrian Revolutionaries Front. 100 members of the latter had been killed by al-Nusra during clashes in July 2014. After that, Nusra launched the 2014 Idlib city raid, which resulted in a failure. They blamed the Syrian Revolutionaries Front for the failure, because, according to al-Nusra, the SRF stabbed them in the back. Then, they launched the offensive. However, according to the Syrian Observatory for Human Rights (SOHR), the clashes between the two sides already started the day before the raid.

Conflict

Zawiya Mountain offensive (October–November 2014)
The clashes between the two sides erupted on 26 October 2014, with conflicting information about the reason. Between 27 and 28 October, the al-Nusra Front attacked the SRF and took over the towns and villages of Balyon, Kesafra, Eblin, Ebdita, Mashon, Maghara and Maghara as well as four of their checkpoints near Maarrat Al-Nu'man. "This has happened before and we came through it. But this time the mobilisation is very large," said a military official in the SRF. He added that the SRF had taken 25 al-Nusra fighters prisoner. He also claimed ISIL fighters were reinforcing the Nusra Front in the assault. But the Syrian Observatory for Human Rights (SOHR) said that it was another hardline group, Jund al-Aqsa, that was providing the backup.

On 28 October, the al-Nusra Front also attacked a checkpoint of the Hazzm Movement in western Aleppo countryside but this attack was repelled and a number of Nusra fighters were reportedly killed. At the same time the Al-Atareb area and the Regiment 46 witnessed a "tension and wait-and-see attitude" after these clashes. Another clash took place between the two parties in the area between Ma’er Debseh and Khan al-Sobol in the Idlib countryside.

On 29 October, Army of Mujahedeen took over the Hazzm Movement checkpoints around al-Atarib, while Ahl Al-Sham was expected to take over the al-Nusra checkpoints in the same area as part of a deal between the rebel groups. Both parties agreed to release all detainees afterwards.

On 30 October, clashes in Khan al-Sibel between the Hazzm Movement against al-Nusra left three fighters dead.

On 31 October 15 Islamic battalions formed the "al-Sohl (peace-keeping) forces" and sent them to the al-Zawiya mount area, where the al-Nusra Front and the SRF were still fighting, in order to separate the two parties from each other. The 15 battalions included: the Army of Mujahedeen, Nour al-Din al-Zanki Islamic Brigades, Sham Legion, the 13th Division, Omar Al-Mukhtar Brigade, the Hazzm Movement, Ahrar ash-Sham, Liwa al-Haqq, Syrian Liberation Front, the al-Awal Brigade, Suqour al-Sham, and Jaysh al-Islam.

Meanwhile, fighting raged between the SRF and al-Nusra in the village of Deir Sinbel, with both sides suffering heavy losses. Before reaching Deir Sinbel, al-Nusra had captured a dozen villages in the area. The next day, al-Nusra forced the SRF to retreat from the village. With the fall of Deir Sinbel, Nusra had taken control of most towns and villages on the Zawiya Mountain. This also  caused many SRF fighters join the al-Nusra Front. At the same time, ISIL sent some of its fighters to the contested area (al-Barah, Kensafrah and the eastern countryside of Ma’arret al-Nu’man) to aid al-Nusra in their fight against the SRF, some of whom were involved in the fight for Deir Sinbel. The Knights of Justice Brigade also reportedly sent a truck carrying ammmunition to support al-Nusra in Deir Sinbel, and later handed over ammunition depots to al-Nusra, along with setting up joint checkpoints at the entrances and exits of Kafr Nabl.

After this, the al-Nusra Front agreed to a proposed cease-fire, starting at 2 o'clock, but demanded that Jamal Maarouf had to appear before a Sharia court within 24 hours after the judge's request.

On 2 November, al-Nusra seized Khan al-Subul, in the Idlib province, after Hazzm Movement fighters retreated from the town. al-Nusra further took control of the villages/towns of Maar Shurin, Ma'saran, Dadikh, Kafr Battikh, and Kafr Rumah from the Islamist rebels and Hazzm Movement, thus taking over almost the entire Zawiya mountain area.

On 3 November, al-Nusra fighters were reportedly gathering in the town of Sarmada in Idlib province, some 4 miles (6 kilometers) from the Bab al-Hawa border crossing that is held by the Islamic Front. If al-Nusra Front seized the crossing, it would block an important supply line for the Western-backed rebels. By that point, the Hazzm Movement was completely defeated. Hundreds of its members defected or escaped; its cache of American weapons was seized by the al-Nusra Front, and the group's leader and some 50 remaining fighters left the area and headed for Aleppo.

The next day, the Northern Knights Brigades in Aleppo province retreated from the Menagh Military Airbase, burning a T-62 tank, in the face of an al-Nusra advance.

On 7 November, the al-Nusra Front, with the support of Jund al-Aqsa, seized the villages of Safuhin, Fatirah and Hazarin in the southern countryside of Idlib, as well as the village of Flayfel in the Shahshabo Mountain.

Further al-Nusra advances (November 2014–March 2015)

On 29 November, Syrian activist Omar Jassim, said that the al-Nusra Front seized the city of al-Rastan, in the Homs  province, and captured a large number of Free Syrian Army fighters after clashes between the two sides, and subsequently established a number of checkpoints in the city.

On 30 November, al-Nusra executed 13 Syrian rebels in Kawkaba, in the south of the Idlib province, after taking the village.

At the end of December 2014, al-Nusra seized another Hazzm Movement post in the Kafar Karmin area of the western countryside of Aleppo.

On 29 January 2015, al-Nusra expelled the rebels from the Regiment 111 base in Aleppo province. At least four rebel fighters were killed in the fighting at the base. The next day, fighting spread to Idlib province where several small al-Nusra checkpoints were attacked and overrun in the Jabal al-Zawiya area. Clashes also occurred at the rebel-held Regiment 46 base during the previous night. Al-Nusra also captured 11 fighters of the FSA Division 16. By the end of the day, al-Nusra's ally Ahrar ash-Sham captured the Bab al-Hawa border crossing with Turkey from the Hazzm Movement after fighting between Hazzm and al-Nusra.

On 16 February, al-Nusra stormed the headquarters of the 7th Brigade (part of the FSA's 101st Division) in the village of Ayn Laroz in the Zawiya Mountain and captured a large cache of weapons after it took control of the FSA's posts. This was the last FSA stronghold in the area.

On 25 February, al-Nusra declared war on the Hazzm Movement and two days later attacked the Hazzm-held Base 46, west of Aleppo city. By 1 March, they captured the base, Meznaz, Kafar Nouran, al-Mashtal, the area of al-Mohandsin and Daret Ezzeh. 60 Hazzm and 40 Nusra fighters were killed. Following the losses, the Hazzm movement dissolved itself, and its remnants joined the Levant Front.

Strategic importance
The Syrian Army victories during the 2014 Hama offensive and the Battle of Murak left the southern countryside of Idlib vulnerable. The infighting between the al-Nusra Front and the SRF endangered the newly formed frontline in the south of Khan Shaykhun. With the loss of its bastion in Idlib, the SRF was left with only a presence in southern Syria. Western-backed rebel groups in Syria were coming under growing pressure as government forces continued to advance in the country’s west and south.

References

Military operations of the Syrian civil war in 2014
Military operations of the Syrian civil war in 2015
Military operations of the Syrian civil war involving the Free Syrian Army
Military operations of the Syrian civil war involving the al-Nusra Front
Military operations of the Syrian civil war involving the Islamic State of Iraq and the Levant
Idlib Governorate in the Syrian civil war
Military operations of the Syrian civil war involving Ahrar al-Sham